A constitutional referendum was held in Switzerland on 19 April 1874. The new constitution was approved by 63.2% of voters and a majority of cantons. It gave more responsibilities and powers to the federal government.

Background
In order to pass, any amendments to the constitution needed a double majority; a majority of the popular vote and majority of the cantons. The decision of each canton was based on the vote in that canton. Full cantons counted as one vote, whilst half cantons counted as half.

Results

References

1874 referendums
1874 in Switzerland
1874
Constitutional referendums in Switzerland